Our Lady of Compassion Church is a Roman Catholic parish church in the Upton Park area of east London, dedicated to Our Lady of Compassion. Catholics in the area had previously worshipped at chapels attached to schools in the area until the church and its parish were both established in 1911.

References

External links
 London Church Buildings

Roman Catholic churches in the London Borough of Newham
1911 establishments in England
20th-century Roman Catholic church buildings in the United Kingdom